is a Japanese light novel series written by Ryō Kawakami and illustrated by Range Murata, based on the manga  by Hajime Isayama.  The series is published by Kodansha in Japan and by Vertical in North America.

Plot
The story follows , a 15-year-old member of the Garrison Regiment, and her childhood friend, the son of wealthy merchants, as their home, comes under siege after the breaching of Wall Maria

Release
The novel was announced in the 33rd issue of Kodansha's Weekly Shōnen Magazine on July 16, 2014.  The books are written by Ryō Kawakami and illustrated by Range Murata.  Kodansha published the first volume on August 1, 2014. and the second and last on May 1, 2015.

North American publisher Vertical announced their license to the series at their New York Comic Con panel on October 11, 2014 and published both volumes in 2015.

Reception
Rebecca Silverman of Anime News Network gave the first volume a grade of B+, calling it "easily the most readable Attack on Titan novel to come out in English". She noted that that Mathias and Rita were believable characters, but expressed a wish to see more of Rita, feeling that her story was more compelling.  She concluded by writing that the series was an easy, enjoyable read, and was more likely to appeal to a broader audience than previous novels in the franchise.

References

Further reading

External links
 Attack on Titan: Harsh Mistress of the City at Kodansha 
 

2014 Japanese novels
Harsh Mistress Of The City
Light novels
Kodansha books
Kodansha Ranobe Bunko
Vertical (publisher) titles